Meristodonoides is an extinct genus of cartilaginous fish. The type species is M. rajkovichi, which was originally a species in the genus Hybodus. The species, along with other Hybodus species such as H. butleri and H. montanensis, was reassigned to Meristodonoides by Charlie J. Underwood and Stephen L. Cumbaa in 2010.

Species 
 M. butleri
 M. montanensis
 M. novojerseyensis
 M. rajkovichi

References

Hybodontiformes
Prehistoric shark genera
Cretaceous sharks
Fossils of Canada